The Vrabac (Sparrow) is a mini drone intended for day/night reconnaissance and surveillance at shorter distances, as well as for target finding and designating, produced in Serbia by Utva Aviation Industry, subsidiary of Yugoimport SDPR.

Design
The VRABAC is a high-wing monoplane made of composite materials. Its fuselage is aerodynamically shaped around the equipment. The nose part contains an 800W DC motor powered by a Li-pol battery while the space below and behind it is intended for electro-optical equipment. The airborne computer is in the central part. The UAV is hand launched and lands with a parachute and an airbag. It is designed to survey and analyze major infrastructural facilities such as pipelines, major roads, bridges, forests, etc.

In 2022, an armed version was revealed that can be equipped with six 40 mm M22 munitions.

Performances and technical characteristics
Vrabac weighs 5.3 kg with a 2.80 meters wing span. It can carry a payload of maximum of 1.5 kg. It has a total of 1 hour flying time and has a maximum flight speed of 85 km/h. The operational range of the Vrabac is >10 km, and its operating height is 300 to 500 meters.

Gallery

Video promotion
 Vrabac  (Sparrow) - mini UAV

See also
 Miniature UAV
 Pegaz 011

References

Vrabac
Military Technical Institute Belgrade
Unmanned military aircraft of Serbia